The 2017 National League speedway season was the third tier/division of British speedway.

Summary
The title was won by Belle Vue Colts. Eastbourne Eagles finished top of the regular season table.

King's Lynn Young Stars withdrew part way through the season and their results were expunged.

Final league table

League scoring system
Home draw = 1
Home win by any number of points = 3
Away loss by 6 points or less = 1
Away draw = 2
Away win by between 1 and 6 points = 3
Away win by 7 points or more = 4

Play-offs

Home team scores are in bold
Overall aggregate scores are in red

National League Knockout Cup
The 2017 National League Knockout Cup was the 20th edition of the Knockout Cup for tier three teams. Eastbourne Eagles were the winners for the third successive year.

First round

Final Stages

{{8TeamBracket-2Leg
|RD1=Quarter-finals
|RD2=Semi-finals
|RD3=Final
|group1=
|group2=
|group3=
|RD1-seed01=
|RD1-team01=Eastbourne Eagles
|RD1-score01-1=
|RD1-score01-2=
|RD1-score01-agg=W/O
|RD1-seed02=
|RD1-team02=King's Lynn Young Stars
|RD1-score02-1=
|RD1-score02-2=
|RD1-score02-agg=
|RD1-seed03=
|RD1-team03=Birmingham Brummies
|RD1-score03-1=43
|RD1-score03-2=41
|RD1-score03-agg=84
|RD1-seed04=
|RD1-team04=Plymouth Devils
|RD1-score04-1=47
|RD1-score04-2=49
|RD1-score04-agg=96
|RD1-seed05=
|RD1-team05=Mildenhall Fen Tigers
|RD1-score05-1=57
|RD1-score05-2=41
|RD1-score05-agg=98
|RD1-seed06=
|RD1-team06=Stoke Potters
|RD1-score06-1=33
|RD1-score06-2=49
|RD1-score06-agg=82
|RD1-seed07=
|RD1-team07=Belle Vue Colts
|RD1-score07-1=59''
|RD1-score07-2=w/o
|RD1-score07-agg=59
|RD1-seed08=
|RD1-team08=Cradley Heathens
|RD1-score08-1=31
|RD1-score08-2=scr
|RD1-score08-agg=31

|RD2-team01=Plymouth Devils
|RD2-seed01=
|RD2-score01-1=50|RD2-score01-2=25
|RD2-score01-agg=75
|RD2-team02=Eastbourne Eagles|RD2-seed02=
|RD2-score02-1=39
|RD2-score02-2=40|RD2-score02-agg=79
|RD2-team03=Mildenhall Fen Tigers|RD2-seed03= 
|RD2-score03-1=53|RD2-score03-2=39
|RD2-score03-agg=92
|RD2-team04=Belle Vue Colts
|RD2-seed04= 
|RD2-score04-1=37
|RD2-score04-2=51|RD2-score04-agg=88

|RD3-team01=Eastbourne Eagles|RD3-seed01=
|RD3-score01-1=59|RD3-score01-2=43
|RD3-score01-agg=102
|RD3-team02=Mildenhall Fen Tigers
|RD3-seed02=
|RD3-score02-1=31
|RD3-score02-2=47|RD3-score02-agg=78
}}Replay was required in the Quarter-final due to tieMildenhall Fen Tigers 50 Stoke Potters 40
Stoke Potters 50 Mildenhall Fen Tigers 40
Mildenhall Fen Tigers 90 Stoke Potters 90

Home team scores are in boldOverall aggregate scores are in red

Final leading averages

Riders & final averagesBelle Vue ColtsDan Bewley 10.96
Lee Payne 9.09
Rob Shuttleworth 9.00
Jack Smith 8.74
Kyle Bickley 8.00
Andy Mellish 6.02
Luke Woodhull 4.52Birmingham BrummiesJack Parkinson-Blackburn 9.35
Liam Carr 9.00 
Danyon Hume 9.00 (2 matches only)
Tom Bacon 8.72	
Darryl Ritchings 8.15	
David Mason 6.87
Layne Cupitt 5.40	
Taylor Hampshire 4.55
Kyle Roberts 2.29
Macauley Leek 2.59Buxton HitmenMax Clegg 9.74
Matt Williamson 9.50
Tom Woolley 6.97
Ryan Kinsley 4.97
Ben Basford 4.33
Shelby Rutherford 4.23
Lee Geary 3.78
Jamie Halder 3.16
Ben Woodhull 3.00
Carl Basford 2.86Cradley HeathensRichard Hall 10.00 (2 matches only)
Tom Perry 9.41
Danny Ayres 8.71
Dan Greenwood 7.69
Luke Harris 6.37
Joe Lawlor 5.87
Conor Dwyer 5.49
Ryan Burton 5.58
Shelby Rutherford 3.93
Tyler Govier 2.00 (2 matches only)Eastbourne EaglesConnor Coles 9.85 (3 matches only)
Mark Baseby 9.30
Josh Bailey 9.13
Jake Knight 9.04
Georgie Wood 8.06
Tom Brennan 7.96
Charley Powell 6.89
Matt Bates 6.42
Kelsey Dugard 5.67Isle of Wight WarriorsJames Cockle 8.39
Ben Wilson	8.25
Connor Coles 6.79
Scott Campos 6.78
Chris Widman 4.97
Adam Portwood 4.51
Kelsey Dugard 4.00
Jamie Sealey 2.31Kent KingsLuke Bowen 9.84
Ben Hopwood 8.26
Jack Thomas 8.08
Dan Greenwood 8.00
Nathan Stoneman 8.00
Luke Clifton 6.67
George Hunter 6.39
Anders Rowe 6.17
Bradley Andrews 5.80Lakeside HammersZach Wajtknecht 10.84
Ben Morley 9.93
Paul Hurry 9.50
Alfie Bowtell 7.51
David Mason 7.50 (2 matches only)
George Hunter 4.00
Connor Locke 3.39
Nick Laurence 3.28
Jamie Couzins 3.09Mildenhall Fen TigersConnor Mountain 9.56
Danny Halsey 8.00
Jordan Jenkins 8.00
Jon Armstrong 7.54
Luke Ruddick 6.14
Danno Verge 5.77
Sam Woods 3.83Plymouth DevilsSteve Boxall 10.02
Adam Roynon 9.91
Benji Compton 6.81
Henry Atkins 5.53
Richard Andrews 5.41
Callum Walker 4.91
Lee Smart 4.24
William O'Keefe 1.85
Rob Parker 1.67Stoke Potters'''
Mitchell Davey	8.87
Tony Atkin 7.68
Lee Dicken 6.91
David Wallinger 6.50
Luke Priest 6.05
Ryan Terry-Daley 5.32
Paul Burnett 5.08
Shaun Tedham 4.07
David Speight 1.00

Development Leagues

Midland Development League

Northern Junior League

Southern Development League

See also
List of United Kingdom Speedway League Champions

References

National League
National League (speedway)
Speedway National League